Vasco Pratolini (19 October 1913 – 12 January 1991) was an Italian writer of the 20th century.
He was nominated for the Nobel Prize in Literature three times.

Biography
Born in Florence, Pratolini worked at various jobs before entering the literary world thanks to his acquaintance with Elio Vittorini. In 1938 he founded, together with Alfonso Gatto, the magazine Campo di Marte. His work is based on firm political principles and much of it is rooted in the ordinary life and sentiments of ordinary, modest working-class people in Florence.

During World War II, he fought with the Italian partisans against the German occupation. After the war he also worked in the cinema, collaborating as screenwriter to films such as Luchino Visconti's Rocco e i suoi fratelli , Roberto Rossellini's Paisà and Nanni Loy's Le quattro giornate di Napoli. In 1954 and 1961 Valerio Zurlini turned two of his novels, Le ragazze di San Frediano and Cronaca familiare, into films.

The Soviet composer Kirill Molchanov produced the Russian-language opera Via del Corno (Улица дель Корно) based on an anti-fascist story by Pratolini, to his own Russian libretto in Moscow, 1960.

His most important literary works are the novels Cronaca familiare (1947), Cronache di poveri amanti (1947) and Metello (1955).

He died in Rome in 1991.

Works

 Il tappeto verde (1941)
 Via de' magazzini (1941)
 Le amiche (1943)
 Il quartiere (1943), translated as The Naked Streets (USA) or A Tale of Santa Croce (UK)
 Cronaca familiare (1947), translated as "Family Chronicle" or Two Brothers
 Cronache di poveri amanti (1947), translated as A Tale of Two Poor Lovers
 Diario sentimentale (1947)
 Mestiere da vagabondo, 1947 (collection of stories)
 Un eroe del nostro tempo (1947), translated in 1951 by Eric Mosbacher as "A Hero of Our Time"
 Le ragazze di San Frediano (1949), translated as The Girls of Sanfrediano
 La domenica della povera gente (1952)
 Lungo viaggio di Natale (1954)
 Metello (1955), translated by Raymond Rosenthal in 1968
 Lo scialo (1960)
 La costanza della ragione (1963), translated as Bruno Santini. A Novel
 Allegoria e derisione (1966)
 La mia città ha trent'anni (1967)
 Il mannello di Natascia (1985)

References

External links
Biography 
 Martha King's English translation of  Cronaca familiare as  Family Chronicle.

1913 births
1991 deaths
Writers from Florence
20th-century Italian novelists
20th-century Italian male writers
20th-century Italian screenwriters
Italian male screenwriters
Italian anti-fascists
Viareggio Prize winners
Italian magazine founders